John Dale may refer to:

Politicians
John Dale (MP) (fl. 1529), English politician
John Dale (Norwegian politician) (born 1940), Norwegian politician

Sports
John Dale (cricketer, born 1848) (1848–1895), English rower and cricketer
John Dale (cricketer, born 1930) (1930–2016), English cricketer

Others
John Dale (doctor) (1885–1952), Australian medical practitioner
John Gilbert Dale (1869–1926), English scientist, and political and trade union activist
John Dale (minister), pulpit minister at Glendale Road Church of Christ in Murray, Kentucky
John Dale (writer) (born 1953), Australian author of crime fiction and true crime books